Madame Pinkette & Co is a 1917 Dutch silent crime film directed by Maurits Binger.

Cast
 Annie Bos - Liane Fraser
 Cecil Ryan - Joseph Limsdock
 Jan van Dommelen - Boekhouder
 Paula de Waart - Peggy
 Adelqui Migliar - Peggy's verloofde
 Fred Penley - Een Engelsman
 Lola Cornero
 Louis van Dommelen
 Alex Benno
 Jules de Koning
 Walter Jochems

External links 
 

1917 films
Dutch silent feature films
Dutch black-and-white films
1917 crime films
Films directed by Maurits Binger
Dutch crime films